Charles Chun (born February 28, 1967) is an American actor who has appeared in television shows such as Criminal Minds, Scrubs, Everybody Loves Raymond, Ned's Declassified School Survival Guide and How I Met Your Mother.

He has also appeared in motion pictures such as Beverly Hills Cop III, Dumb & Dumber, Double Tap, The Interview, and My Favorite Martian. In 1996, he guest starred in the popular Star Trek: Deep Space Nine episode "Trials and Tribble-ations", in which he played a Starfleet engineer serving aboard the original USS Enterprise from Star Trek: The Original Series.

He appeared in a single episode of The O.C, as the man who evicts Julie Cooper from Caleb Nichol's home, as a doctor in an episode of Beyond Belief: Fact or Fiction and as a call-girl obsessed former brother in law of a District Attorney in Castle'''s second season. He also made a guest star appearance in Big Time Rush'', as Lucy's dad.

Select TV and filmography

References

External links

Living people
American male film actors
American male television actors
American male voice actors
Place of birth missing (living people)
American male actors of Korean descent
20th-century American male actors
21st-century American male actors
1967 births
Connecticut College alumni